BKV Előre SC is a Hungarian football club located in Budapest, Hungary. It currently plays in Hungarian National Championship III. The team's colors are yellow and blue.

Honours
Hungarian Cup:
 Runner-up (1) :1933–34

References

External links
Official website

Association football clubs established in 1912
Football clubs in Budapest
1912 establishments in Hungary
Railway association football clubs in Hungary